"Everything and More" is a song recorded by Canadian country music artist Jim Witter. It was released in 1993 as the first single from his debut album, Jim Witter. It peaked at number 5 on the RPM Country Tracks chart in June 1993.

Chart performance

Year-end charts

References

1993 songs
Jim Witter songs
1993 debut singles
Songs written by Jim Witter
FRE Records singles